Drvenija is a neighborhood in Sarajevo, Bosnia and Herzegovina.

The neighborhood was named after the bridge that was built in 1898.

Geography of Sarajevo